Abramtsevo is the name of several rural localities in Russia:
Abramtsevo (selo), Dmitrovsky District, Moscow Oblast, a selo in Sinkovskoye Rural Settlement of Dmitrovsky District in Moscow Oblast; 
Abramtsevo (village), Dmitrovsky District, Moscow Oblast, a village in Sinkovskoye Rural Settlement of Dmitrovsky District in Moscow Oblast; 
Abramtsevo, Sergiyevo-Posadsky District, Moscow Oblast, a selo under the administrative jurisdiction of the Town of Khotkovo in Sergiyevo-Posadsky District of Moscow Oblast; 
Abramtsevo, Vologda Oblast, a village in Spassky Selsoviet of Vologodsky District in Vologda Oblast

See also
Abramtsev, Russian last name